Oculeus is an extinct genus from a well-known class of fossil marine arthropods, the trilobites. It lived during the Cambrian Period, which lasted from approximately 539 to 485 million years ago.

References

Ptychopariida
Cambrian trilobites
Cambrian trilobites of Asia
Cambrian trilobites of Europe